ikeGPS Limited, or IKE,  is an American-based New Zealand company, founded in 2014, which provides services for measuring, modeling as well as managing power and telecommunications assets.

History
ikeGPS was founded in 2014. Its main business activities are selling systems that are aimed at assessing and deploying communications and electric utility networks, often managed in GIS Geographical Information Systems. IKE is headquartered in Broomfield, Colorado, with offices in Wellington, New Zealand.

Products
The company provides products which allow users to record the geodata of multiple targets together with their photographs. This is intended to be done from a distance, which can be of assistance if the user is dealing with any hard to reach or dangerous target.

GPS World has reviewed ikeGPS as the “best GPS device in the world” for its purpose.

The Spike product uses a phone camera, a laser-based system and mobile app software to capture location, height, width, and distance of any object with 1% accuracy.

Applications
ikeGPS' software and hardware is used by communications companies, such as AT&T and over 400 North American utilities for pole loading analysis, make ready engineering and associated network.  Its mobile products are deployed by transportation departments, local governments, by intelligence and defense groups and other organizations for emergency management and enterprise asset management.

See also
 Geotagging
 Utility Pole Inspections
 Asset Management
 Remote Data Collection
 Joint Use Pole Audit

References

Electronics companies of New Zealand
Data collection